Stefano Tilli (born 22 August 1962) is a former Italian sprinter who specialized in the 100 and 200 m, twice European indoor champion, three-time semi-finalist at the Olympic Games, and was the world record holder in the 200m indoor.

Biography
Tilli was born in Orvieto, Umbria.  In his career he won 17 medals at the International athletics competitions, eight of these with national relays team. He also won 14 national championships, from 1984 to 2000, and he has 51 caps in national team, from 1983 to 2000. His personal best in the 100m is 10.16 seconds, which he ran in August 1984 in Zurich. His personal best in the 200m is 20.40 seconds, achieved in September 1984 in Cagliari.

Stefano Tilli used to be engaged to the Jamaican sprinter Merlene Ottey, whom he also coached for a period.

Record

World record
 200 metres indoor: 20.52 ( Turin, 21 February 1985) - until 22 February 1987 (Bruno Marie-Rose, France 20.36 in Liévin)

European record
 4 × 200 metres relay: 1:21.10 ( Cagliari 29 September 1983), Italy (Stefano Tilli, Carlo Simionato, Giovanni Bongiorni, Pietro Mennea) - current holder

Achievements

National titles
Tilli won 14 national championships at individual senior level.

Italian Athletics Championships
100 m: 1984, 1986, 1989, 1990, 1992, 1997 (6)
100 m: 1986, 1988, 1991 (3)
Italian Athletics Indoor Championships
60 m: 1995, 1996, 2000 (3)
200 m: 1985, 1987 (2)

See also
 Italian all-time lists - 100 metres
 Italian all-time lists - 200 metres
 Italy national relay team
 Italy national athletics team - More caps

References

External links
 

1962 births
Living people
People from Orvieto
Italian male sprinters
Athletes (track and field) at the 1984 Summer Olympics
Athletes (track and field) at the 1988 Summer Olympics
Athletes (track and field) at the 1996 Summer Olympics
Athletes (track and field) at the 2000 Summer Olympics
Olympic athletes of Italy
World Athletics Championships athletes for Italy
World Athletics Championships medalists
European Athletics Championships medalists
Sportspeople from the Province of Terni
Mediterranean Games gold medalists for Italy
Mediterranean Games bronze medalists for Italy
Mediterranean Games medalists in athletics
Athletes (track and field) at the 1983 Mediterranean Games
Athletes (track and field) at the 1987 Mediterranean Games
Athletes (track and field) at the 1991 Mediterranean Games
Italian Athletics Championships winners